Sam Apple (born 1975) is a non-fiction writer.

Life
Sam Apple received an undergraduate degree at the University of Michigan. After Michigan, he studied writing at Columbia University in the Master of Fine Arts program.

Apple is the author of Ravenous: Otto Warburg, the Nazis, and the Search for the Cancer-Diet Connection. Liveright editor Robert Weil solicited the book after reading one of Apple's articles in The New York Times Magazine. Apple has also written two books for Ballantine Books, Schlepping Through the Alps: My Search for Austria's Jewish Past with Its Last Wandering Shepherd and American Parent: My Strange and Surprising Adventures in Modern Babyland. Apple is on the faculty of the MA in Science Writing program at Johns Hopkins University. He has also been an adjunct professor of creative writing and entrepreneurial journalism at the University of Pennsylvania. He was a finalist for the PEN America Award for a first work of non-fiction.

Apple was editor of New Voices magazine, director of interactive media at Nerve.com, and publisher of The Faster Times. Apple has written for numerous publications including The New York Times Magazine, The Financial Times, The New Yorker, Wired, McSweeney's, The Atlantic,The Los Angeles Times, The New Republic, ESPN The Magazine, and Slate.com. Apple's short stories have appeared in Tablet (magazine).

Family
He is the son of novelist Max Apple and is married to Jennifer Fried, a lawyer. They have three children
.

Works
Ravenous: Otto Warburg, the Nazis, and the Search for the Cancer-Diet Connection. Liveright, 2021. American Parent: My Strange and Surprising Adventures in Modern Babyland, Random House Publishing Group, 2009The Saddest Toilet in the World, Illustrator Sam Ricks, Simon and Schuster, 2016, The Day the Kids Took Over,''  Little Brown and Company, 2021.

References

External links
  Sam Apple discusses cancer and metabolism on CBS News
 Sam Apple on Parents and Science
 Apple on Schlepping Through the Alps
 Article about Sam Apple and The Faster Times in The New York Observer

Living people
American non-fiction writers
University of Michigan alumni
Columbia University School of the Arts alumni
1975 births
Jewish American writers
21st-century American Jews